The 1966 United States Senate election in New Jersey was held on November 8, 1966. Incumbent Republican Clifford P. Case defeated Democratic nominee Warren W. Wilentz with 60.02% of the vote.

Primary elections were held on September 13, 1966. Case was unopposed, while Wilentz easily won his primary over Dr. David Frost, who opposed the Vietnam War, and John J. Winberry, who ran on opposition to the state sales tax.

Republican primary

Candidates
Clifford P. Case, incumbent United States Senator

Results

Democratic primary

Candidates
Jerry Charles Burmeister, patent development executive
Clarence Coggins, Jersey City resident
David Frost, research biologist and peace activist
Warren W. Wilentz, former Middlesex County Attorney
John J. Winberry, former Deputy Attorney General of New Jersey

Results

General election

Candidates
Clifford P. Case, incumbent Senator since 1955 (Republican)
Jules Levin (Socialist Labor)
Robert Lee Schlachter (Independent)
Warren W. Wilentz, former Middlesex County Attorney (Democratic)

Results

References

1966
New Jersey
United States Senate